Theodemund was a Suevic King of Galicia between the years 469 and 550.  This period is very obscure and little is known about the rulers in this time save that they were Arians. The hypothesis of his existence is based on a twelfth-century document that mentions a Theodemundus ruling the Sueves between Remismund and Theodomir. Because this mention occurs in a listing of seventh-century ecclesiastical divisions at the time of Wamba, Wilhelm Reinhart believes it was based on an earlier source.

Sources

Arias, Jorge C. "Identity and Interactions: The Suevi and the Hispano-Romans." University of Virginia: Spring 2007.

6th-century Suebian kings
6th-century Arian Christians